Fabio Morena (born 19 March 1980 in Musberg, West Germany) is a German former professional footballer who played as a defender.

References

External links
  
 
 

1980 births
Living people
German footballers
Association football defenders
VfB Stuttgart II players
Alicante CF footballers
FC St. Pauli players
SV Sandhausen players
Hamburger SV II players
Bundesliga players
2. Bundesliga players
Regionalliga players
Segunda División B players
German expatriate footballers
German expatriate sportspeople in Spain
Expatriate footballers in Spain